"Vroum Vroum" is a 2021 single by French rapper of Moroccan origin Moha K. Released by WLAB records label, it topped the SNEP, official French Singles Chart for 1 week. It is taken from Moha K's album Dernier Souffle. The song also charted in Switzerland and in Ultratop Belgian French Charts. An official music video was released directed by Yanlebatard.

Moha K is a young French artist born in 2000 in Agadir, Morocco as Mohamed Ait El Kaid, He moved to France at the age of 13.

Charts

Weekly charts

Year-end charts

References

External links
Moha K YouTube channel: Moha K - Vroum Vroum (Clip officiel)

2021 singles
Number-one singles in France